The Avengers are a team of fictional superheroes and the protagonists of the Marvel Cinematic Universe (MCU) media franchise, based on the Marvel Comics team of the same name created by Stan Lee and Jack Kirby in 1963. Founded by S.H.I.E.L.D. Director Nick Fury, the team is a United States-based organization composed primarily of superpowered and gifted individuals, described as "Earth's Mightiest Heroes", who are committed to the world's protection from a variety of threats. The Avengers are depicted as operating in the state of New York: originally from the Avengers Tower in Midtown Manhattan and subsequently from the Avengers Compound in Upstate New York.

The concept of the Avengers was teased in the post-credits scene of Iron Man (2008), the first MCU film, by Nick Fury as an initiative planned by him. The concept was further explored in Iron Man 2 (2010), with the introduction of Natasha Romanoff. The team was eventually established in the crossover-style film The Avengers (2012), which, followed by Avengers: Age of Ultron (2015), Avengers: Infinity War (2018) and Avengers: Endgame (2019), established a series of four films that headlined the MCU and became the sixth highest-grossing film series of all time, with the MCU franchise overall ranking first. Arranged as an ensemble of core MCU characters such as Iron Man, Captain America and Thor, they are central to the MCU's Infinity Saga and have been acclaimed as an important part of the franchise. The Avengers are set to return in two films Avengers: The Kang Dynasty and Avengers: Secret Wars, with the former releasing in 2025 and the latter in 2026. Both films will be the conclusion of the MCU's Multiverse Saga.

Concept and creation

In the mid-2000s, Kevin Feige realized that Marvel still owned the rights to the core members of the Avengers. Feige, a self-professed "fanboy", envisioned creating a shared universe just as creators Stan Lee and Jack Kirby had done with their comic books in the early 1960s.

Ideas for a film based on the Avengers began in 2003, with Avi Arad, the CEO of Marvel Studios, first announcing plans to develop the film in April 2005, after Marvel Enterprises declared independence by allying with Merrill Lynch to produce a slate of films that would be distributed by Paramount Pictures. Marvel discussed their plans in a brief presentation to Wall Street analysts; the studio's intention was to release individual films for the main characters—to establish their identities and familiarise audiences with them—before merging the characters together in a crossover film. Screenwriter Zak Penn, who wrote The Incredible Hulk which introduced Hulk, became attached to the film in 2006 and was hired by Marvel Studios to write the film in June 2007. In the wake of the 2007–2008 Writers Guild of America strike, Marvel negotiated with the Writers Guild of America to ensure that it could create films based on its comic book counterparts, including Captain America, Ant-Man and The Avengers. After the successful release of Iron Man (2008) in May which introduced Iron Man, the company set a July 2011 release date for The Avengers. In September 2008, Marvel Studios reached an agreement with Paramount—an extension of a previous partnership—which gave the company distribution rights for five future Marvel films.

In October 2008, two major prospects occurred for Marvel Studios: Jon Favreau was brought in as an executive producer for the film, and the company signed a long-term lease with Raleigh Studios to produce three other big-budget films—Iron Man 2, introducing Black Widow; Thor, introducing Thor with a cameo appearance of Hawkeye; and Captain America: The First Avenger, introducing Captain America—at their Manhattan Beach, California complex. Executive producer Jon Favreau stated that he would not direct the film, but would "definitely have input and a say". Favreau also expressed concerns, stating, "It's going to be hard, because I was so involved in creating the world of Iron Man, and Iron Man is very much a tech-based hero, and then with Avengers you're going to be introducing some supernatural aspects because of Thor [Mixing] the two of those works very well in the comic books, but it's going to take a lot of thoughtfulness to make that all work and not blow the reality that we've created". In March 2009, Marvel announced that the film's release date had been pushed back to May 4, 2012, almost a full year later.

In July 2009, Penn talked about the crossover process, stating, "My job is to kind of shuttle between the different movies and make sure that finally we're mimicking that comic book structure where all of these movies are connected. There's just a board that tracks 'Here's where everything that happens in this movie overlaps with that movie'. I'm pushing them to do as many animatics as possible to animate the movie, to draw boards so that we're all working off the same visual ideas. But the exigencies of production take first priority". At first, Penn tried to reduce Thor's role in the script because he had doubts about the character's ability to succeed on film. He changed his mind once Chris Hemsworth was cast as Thor. The film had always intended to use Loki as its villain, but Penn noted that early discussion had considered using Red Skull.

In January 2010, Marvel Studios chief Kevin Feige was asked if it would be difficult to meld the fantasy of Thor with the high-tech science fiction in Iron Man and The Avengers. "No," he said, "because we're doing the Jack Kirby/Stan Lee/Walt Simonson/J. Michael Straczynski Thor. We're not doing the blow-the-dust-off-of-the-old-Norse-book-in-your-library Thor. And in the Thor of the Marvel Universe, there's a race called the Asgardians. And we're linked through this Tree of Life that we're unaware of. It's real science, but we don't know about it yet. The 'Thor' movie is about teaching people that". In March, it was reported that Penn had completed the first draft of the script, and that Marvel editor-in-chief Joe Quesada and Avengers comic-book writer Brian Michael Bendis had received copies. Numerous aspects and elements of both the Ultimates and the Earth-616 Avengers were utilized for the look and storyline of the 2012 live action film Marvel's The Avengers, which introduced the assembled team of Avengers.

Film appearances

The Avengers play a central role in the Marvel Cinematic Universe's Infinity Saga, being the focus in multiple feature films, beginning with the eponymous 2012 live-action film, The Avengers, and followed by the sequels Avengers: Age of Ultron (2015), Avengers: Infinity War (2018), and Avengers: Endgame (2019), the latter two of which were based on "The Infinity Gauntlet" storyline. The Avengers were featured in Captain America: Civil War (2016), which was loosely based on the "Civil War" storyline. They also appeared in the mid-credits scene of Captain Marvel (2019), set immediately after Infinity War and before Endgame. They are set to return in Avengers: The Kang Dynasty in 2025 and Avengers: Secret Wars in 2026.

Fictional team biography

Avengers Initiative

In 1995, the Avengers Initiative is created by S.H.I.E.L.D. director Nick Fury, who envisions a group of heroes working together in response to planetary threats, following the appearance of superhumans such as Carol Danvers. He names his plan after her U.S. Air Force callsign, "Avenger". Years later, Fury assesses various individuals for the initiative, including Tony Stark and Steve Rogers. Stark's membership is declined after a negative report on his suitability by Natasha Romanoff. The World Security Council expresses a desire for Emil Blonsky to join the initiative, although they abandon their wish after Stark deters Thaddeus Ross from the idea, instead bringing in Bruce Banner.

The First Assembly

In 2012, the Asgardian Loki teleports to the Joint Dark Energy Mission Facility on Earth, where he steals the Tesseract and brainwashes Clint Barton and Dr. Erik Selvig using his scepter. Following the attack, Fury recruits Stark and Banner to locate the Tesseract. Rogers, Romanoff, and Stark apprehend Loki, but are disrupted by the arrival of Thor. This leads to confrontations between the group, exacerbated by the revelation that S.H.I.E.L.D. is building weapons of mass destruction using the Tesseract, during which the brainwashed Barton attacks the Helicarrier, provoking Banner to transform into the Hulk and go on a rampage.

Battle of New York
After Loki kills S.H.I.E.L.D. agent Phil Coulson, the team unites to avenge him. Romanoff frees Barton from mind control, and the Avengers depart to confront Loki, who subsequently opens a wormhole on Stark Tower using the Tesseract and begins his invasion, with the Avengers, led by Rogers, fighting his Chitauri army. During the battle, the World Security Council launches a nuclear strike toward Manhattan against Fury's wishes, but the missile is intercepted by Stark, who flies it through the wormhole and destroys the Chitauri mother ship, deactivating the army. Romanoff uses Loki's scepter to close the portal, and Loki is apprehended and taken to Asgard. The Avengers also unite to eat shawarma in the aftermath of the battle, while Stark Tower is renamed "Avengers Tower".

Fighting Hydra and Ultron

Three years after his attack on New York City, Loki's scepter, formerly in the possession of S.H.I.E.L.D., is used by Hydra following the collapse of S.H.I.E.L.D. The Avengers track it down to the Eastern European nation of Sokovia, where they fight to recover it, and encounter the superhuman Hydra test subjects Wanda Maximoff and Pietro Maximoff. Barton is wounded in the battle, Rogers captures Hydra's leader Wolfgang von Strucker and Stark manages to retrieve the scepter despite being subjected to apocalyptic hallucinations by Wanda's telepathy. Stark and Banner decide to use the scepter to create the Ultron Program as an artificial intelligence peacekeeping force. Meanwhile, the Avengers celebrate their victory. However, the newly designed A.I. attacks the Avengers as Ultron, intent on destroying the Avengers, and later kills Strucker. The Avengers are divided over Stark's creation, who maintains it was intended to protect Earth from looming cosmic threats.

In Africa, the Avengers confront Ultron, now allied with the Maximoff twins, and a fight ensues. Wanda induces telekinetic hallucinations upon the Avengers, and triggers Banner's transformation into the Hulk before she is stopped by Barton. The Hulk rampages through Johannesburg until being stopped by Stark in his Hulkbuster armor. After regrouping and encountering Nick Fury at Clint Barton's farmhouse, Rogers, Barton and Romanoff retrieve a new vibranium body created by Ultron. Stark and Banner upload J.A.R.V.I.S. into the body, although they face resistance from Rogers and the Maximoffs. Thor, having experienced a vision of the Infinity Stones, uses Mjolnir to supercharge the process, creating The Vision.

Battle of Sokovia
After losing the Vision as its new body, Ultron tries to cause an extinction event by using Sokovia as a meteor. The Avengers, joined by James Rhodes and the Maximoffs, defeat Ultron's sentries and evacuate civilians. Pietro is killed saving Barton, and Sokovia is exploded by Stark and Thor to prevent human extinction. Vision eventually destroys the last remaining body of Ultron. In the aftermath of the battle, Stark and Barton decide to retire as active members of the team with the latter having promised his wife to come back home once the mission was over; Banner disappears, and Thor goes to space to track down the Infinity Stones; while Rhodes, Sam Wilson, Wanda, and the Vision join the team, under the leadership of Rogers and Romanoff. The Avengers also move to the new Avengers Compound in Upstate New York as their primary headquarters.

Civil War

Months after the Battle of Sokovia, the Avengers New Facility becomes the target of a heist, with a skirmish between Wilson and Scott Lang.

In 2016, Rogers, Romanoff, Maximoff, and Wilson defend a research lab in Lagos from Brock Rumlow. They successfully stop Rumlow and his crew of mercenaries, but when an attempted suicide attack by Rumlow is deflected by Maximoff through telekinesis, Wakandan diplomats are killed. As a result, Secretary of State Thaddeus Ross presents the Sokovia Accords to the Avengers, a United Nations (U.N.) legislation that would bring the Avengers and other superhumans under the direct authority of the U.N. Although Stark, Rhodes, Vision and Romanoff support the idea, Rogers and Wilson object due to fears of their autonomy being limited while Maximoff is uncertain.

After Bucky Barnes is accused of killing King T'Chaka of Wakanda in an explosion, Rogers and Wilson seek to protect him from an arrest warrant, causing them to clash with Stark, Rhodes, Romanoff and T'Challa, son of T'Chaka. After Barnes is detained in Berlin, Helmut Zemo activates his 'Winter Soldier' alter-ego using the Winter Soldier Book, although Barnes later comes to his senses and reveals Zemo's interest in the Winter Soldier Program. To assist them, Wilson recruits Lang and Rogers recruits Barton, who comes out of retirement, confronts the Vision and takes Maximoff out of de facto house arrest at the Avengers Compound. The two sides of the Avengers then confront at the Leipzig/Halle Airport, with Rogers, Barnes, Wilson, Barton, Lang and Maximoff facing Stark, Rhodes, Romanoff, the Vision, T'Challa and new recruit Peter Parker.

Rogers and Barnes manage to escape with Romanoff's help, who betrays Stark to find Zemo, while their teammates are imprisoned in the Raft. Rhodes' legs are paralyzed when he falls after being accidentally struck by a blast from the Vision that was aimed at Wilson. Rogers and Barnes head to the Hydra Siberian Facility to stop Zemo from reactivating the Winter Soldier Program, and are joined by Stark, who realized Barnes' innocence. However, Zemo shows Stark footage of Barnes' assassination of Stark's parents, turning Stark against Rogers and Barnes. In the ensuing fight, Rogers disables Stark's armor, whilst Barnes' cybernetic arm is destroyed and Rogers abandons his shield. Meanwhile, T'Challa apprehends Zemo after discovering he was his father's true killer. Rogers later breaks out his teammates from the Raft with the help of Romanoff arriving on a Quinjet, with Stark declining to stop him. Afterwards, Barton and Lang make a deal with the U.S. government to be placed under house arrest so that they may go back to their respected families.

Aftermath

Although officially reduced to just Stark, Vision and Rhodes, the Avengers continue operating. Stark sells Avengers Tower, and Parker is offered a place on the Avengers roster by Stark (who initially thought he wasn't ready) after defeating Adrian Toomes, although he declines, choosing to remain a neighborhood superhero and having come to slowly understand the dangers of his superhero life. Parker promises Stark that though not being a member of Avengers, he will help Avengers whenever they want him.

Infinity War

In 2018, the Avengers come into conflict with Thanos and his children, who are seeking the six Infinity Stones to erase half of all life in the universe. Thanos forcefully boards the Statesman, kills Loki, and incapacitates Thor. Banner, as the Hulk, is also defeated by Thanos but is sent to Earth by Heimdall to inform Stephen Strange, the keeper of the Time Stone, as well as his friend Wong, of Thanos' impending arrival. Strange, Wong and Banner, joined by Stark and Parker, confront Ebony Maw and Cull Obsidian in Greenwich Village. With the Hulk reluctant to emerge, Strange is captured by Maw, while Banner contacts Rogers to warn him of Thanos' intention to acquire Vision's Mind Stone.

Battle of Titan
In space aboard Maw's ship, Stark and Parker pursue Strange and kill Maw, after which Stark anoints Parker as an official Avenger. On Stark's urging, they head for Thanos' home planet Titan, where they ally with the Guardians of the Galaxy after initial hostility. The Avengers and Guardians are able to restrain Thanos and attempt to take the Infinity Gauntlet, wielding four of the Stones, off him. However, an enraged Peter Quill attacks Thanos upon learning of the death of Gamora, allowing Thanos to escape. Thanos incapacitates the group, and Strange surrenders the Time Stone to save Stark's life, contradicting his previous promise not to.

Attack in Edinburgh and Battle of Wakanda
Meanwhile, Rogers, Romanoff and Wilson, fugitives since 2016, intercept an attack on Vision and Maximoff in Edinburgh. They return to the Avengers Compound, where they reunite with Rhodes and Banner. Learning of the threat, Vision proposes to be destroyed to prevent Thanos from acquiring the Mind Stone, but Wanda and the Avengers refuse and travel to Wakanda, where Shuri, sister of T'Challa, begins an operation to remove the Stone from the Vision. Meanwhile, the Wakandan army, the Jabari Tribe, the Dora Milaje, and Barnes ally with the Avengers to defend Vision from Thanos' children and the Outriders. Banner, unable to become the Hulk, dons a modified Hulkbuster armor, and Thor, Rocket and Groot also arrive in Wakanda and join the battle, with Thor wielding his newly forged axe, Stormbreaker.

Corvus Glaive ambushes Shuri, stopping her from operating on the Vision. Vision kills Glaive, Banner kills Obsidian, and Wanda kills Proxima Midnight during the battle. When Thanos arrives, Vision urges Maximoff to destroy the Mind Stone. Rogers rallies the Avengers in an unsuccessful attempt to stop Thanos. Wanda tearfully destroys the Stone, killing Vision, but Thanos uses the Time Stone to reverse the action and retrieves the Stone from Vision's forehead, killing him once more. With the Gauntlet now assembled, Thanos, despite being attacked by Thor, initiates the Blip, causing Wilson, Barnes, Wanda, Strange, Parker, T'Challa, Groot, Quill, Drax, and Mantis to disintegrate, leaving Stark and Nebula alone on Titan while the surviving Avengers in Wakanda rue their defeat after Thanos retreats.

Nick Fury and Maria Hill are blipped as they try to find out Stark and the Avengers' location but not before Fury manages to summon Carol Danvers. Barton's family also blips while he is on house arrest as he's left to mourn their loss. Upon learning of what happened he becomes the murderous vigilante Ronin to kill those he believes did not deserve to be spared by the Blip. Lang gets trapped in the Quantum Realm while he was there harvesting energy from it, as Hank Pym, Hope and Janet van Dyne who were going to pull him out get blipped.

Reversing the Blip

Three weeks later, the Avengers are reunited with Stark after he and Nebula are rescued from space by Danvers. Following an outburst from Stark towards Rogers over not supporting him on Titan, the rest of the Avengers detect an energy surge from Thanos' Garden planet, and Rogers, Romanoff, Banner, Thor, Danvers, Rhodes, Rocket and Nebula head there to ambush him. Thanos reveals that he destroyed the Infinity Stones, prompting an enraged Thor to decapitate him.

During the next five years, Romanoff becomes the leader of the Avengers, having officially recruited Danvers, Rocket and Nebula to the team. Romanoff's Avengers work to quell disturbances on both Earth and other planets caused by the Blip, and they work closely with Okoye of Wakanda. Rogers becomes a grief counselor, while Stark retires to live with his wife Pepper Potts and daughter Morgan. Barton, with his family having fallen victim to the Blip, becomes a criminal-hunting vigilante called Ronin. Thor, overcome by depression, becomes an overweight alcoholic. Banner merges his personalities, retaining his intelligence in the Hulk's body.

Time Heist
In 2023, following the release of a trapped Scott Lang from the Quantum Realm, Lang visits Rogers and Romanoff and explains that he only experienced five hours in the Realm rather than five years, and thus suggests time travel as a method of reversing the Blip. Lang, Rogers and Romanoff visit Stark and Banner to discuss the plan, with Stark refusing and Banner running unsuccessful time travel tests on Lang using Pym's quantum tunnel. Following this, Stark, remembering the loss of Parker and the others, helps the team develop successful time travel using Pym Particles, with the Avengers conducting an operation dubbed by Lang as the "Time Heist".

Banner, Rogers, Stark and Lang travel to New York City in 2012. Banner is given the Time Stone by the Ancient One after revealing Strange's surrender of it, Lang retrieves the Mind Stone (housed in Loki's Scepter), and Stark and Rogers retrieve the Space Stone from 1970 after failing to retrieve it from 2012. Thor and Rocket retrieve the Reality Stone and Mjolnir from Asgard in 2013. Rhodes and Nebula retrieve the Power Stone from Morag in 2014, but Nebula is captured by a Thanos from 2014 and 2014 Nebula returns to 2023. Barton retrieves the Soul Stone after Romanoff sacrifices herself on Vormir to allow Barton to obtain it.

Battle of Earth

Reuniting in the present, the Avengers place the Stones into a gauntlet designed by Stark, Banner, and Rocket. Banner, having the most resistance to their gamma radiation, wields the gauntlet and reverses the Blip. Meanwhile, 2014-Nebula, impersonating her future self, uses the time machine to transport 2014-Thanos and his warship to the present, destroying the Avengers Compound in the process. Present-day Nebula convinces 2014-Gamora to betray Thanos, but is unable to convince 2014-Nebula and kills her. Thanos overpowers Stark, Thor, and Rogers, who wields Mjolnir. Thanos summons his army to retrieve the Stones, intent on using them to destroy the universe and create a new one. A restored Strange arrives with other sorcerers, the restored Avengers and Guardians of the Galaxy, the Ravagers, and the armies of Wakanda and Asgard to fight Thanos' army. Danvers also arrives and destroys Thanos' warship, but Thanos overpowers her using the Power Stone and seizes the gauntlet. After a prompt from Strange, Stark obtains the Stones and uses them to disintegrate Thanos and his army, but the strain of using them kills him.

Aftermath

Following Stark's funeral, the Avengers disband. Rogers returns the Infinity Stones and Mjolnir to their proper timelines and travels to another timeline to be with Peggy Carter. Rogers then returns an elderly man and passes his shield and the mantle of Captain America to Wilson.

Thor appoints Valkyrie as the new ruler of New Asgard and heads for space with the Guardians, including Rocket and Nebula, he later splits up with them upon discovering the threat of a man named Gorr, wherein he teams up with Korg, Valkyrie and his ex-girlfriend Jane Foster, whom he had not seen for eight years following their breakup and is undergoing cancer treatment as well as has received powers like his due to wielding a reconstructed Mjolnir (which bonded to her, due to a protective enchantment unknowingly left by Thor) to stop him, Thor loses Jane once she succumbs to her cancer and then regains Mjolnir while passing on Stormbreaker to Gorr's daughter Love, who was revived by Eternity and was adopted by Thor as per Gorr's dying request.

Maximoff, in her grief from what happened, creates a magical false reality in Westview, New Jersey, which eventually unravels the origin of her true self as the Scarlet Witch while also coming into conflict with S.W.O.R.D. She is supported by Monica Rambeau, Jimmy Woo, and Darcy Lewis. Her powers revive Vision, now with an altered appearance and without the Mind Stone as power-source while also creating twin children, Billy and Tommy Maximoff. Corrupted by the Darkhold, Maximoff learns of the multiverse and tries to unite with alternate real versions of her children. However, in late 2024, she is stopped and helped by Strange, Wong and America Chavez.

Rhodes and Wilson return to the U.S. military, and eventually Wilson accepts Rogers' legacy and becomes the new Captain America after stopping the threat of the Flag-Smashers with Bucky Barnes' help.

Danvers and Banner remain in contact and they answer Wong's call to discuss the origin of Shang-Chi's Ten Rings with the latter. Banner, currently living off the grid in Mexico trains his cousin, lawyer Jennifer Walters after she receives his gamma-radiated abilities upon cross-contamination with his blood following an accident, despite her reluctance to be a superhero. Banner then travels to Sakaar, and brings his son Skaar back to Earth.

Parker returns to school and briefly becomes Stark's chosen successor until he is brought into conflict with a former employee of Stark's Quentin Beck, who reveals Parker's secret identity and frames him as his murderer, putting Parker's reputation in jeopardy and drastically affecting his personal life. Although he manages to avoid legal troubles with lawyer Matt Murdock's help, the damage to his personal life due to controversy causes him to seek Strange's help to reverse it with a spell to make his identity secret again, but the events that transpire cause the multiverse to open and to save his universe from collapsing, Parker chooses to have the world's knowledge of his civilian identity completely erased, including the bonds he shared with his former friends and allies. Now anonymous and having lost his Aunt May in the conflict, he resumes his vigilantism as Spider-Man.

Barton retires and lives with his family at his Iowa farm. While on a Christmas vacation with his children in New York City, his previous actions as Ronin cause him to come into conflict with elements of organized crime including Wilson Fisk, Maya Lopez and her Tracksuit Mafia as well as Romanoff's adoptive sister, Yelena Belova, who holds him responsible for her sister's death. He eventually makes peace with Yelena, and he also takes in a protégé named Kate Bishop, whose life he had saved during the Battle of New York.

In 2025, the first annual "AvengerCon" is held at Camp Lehigh to honor the Avengers. It is attended by Kamala Khan, an Avengers-fangirl (particularly a fan of Danvers) who gains powers after putting on a golden bangle heirloom while cosplaying as Danvers.

Lang becomes a famous celebrity, while spending time with Hope and his daughter, Cassie, and befriending Woo. He then starts a podcast, called Big Me Little Me, and writes a bestselling memoir called Look Out For The Little Guy, in which he gives the Avengers' account for the Battle of Earth. Lang, Cassie, Hope van Dyne, Hank Pym and Janet van Dyne are sucked into the Quantum Realm. There, they confront Kang the Conquerer, who forces Lang to help him escape from the Quantum Realm. The group successfully return home and prevent Kang from escaping.

However, the Council of Kangs overseeing the Multiverse make note that the Avengers from the 616 universe, such as Barton, Banner, Thor, Parker, Maximoff, and Lang have started learning of the multiverse and needed to be stopped.

Team roster

Other characters

Many characters have been affiliated with the Avengers in the Marvel Cinematic Universe:
 S.H.I.E.L.D. Director Nick Fury is the creator of the Avengers and assists them numerous times.
 Phil Coulson contributes to the Avengers' creation as a S.H.I.E.L.D. agent serving Fury. Fury described him as much of an Avenger as the superheroes.
 S.H.I.E.L.D. assists the Avengers in the Battle of New York. Even after its collapse, S.H.I.E.L.D. agents like Maria Hill fight alongside the Avengers in the Battle of Sokovia.
 Erik Selvig and Helen Cho begin working for the Avengers during the events of Avengers: Age of Ultron.
 T'Challa / Black Panther and Bucky Barnes / Winter Soldier / White Wolf fight alongside the Avengers during the Avengers Civil War, the Battle of Wakanda, and the Battle of Earth.
 Individuals like Ayo, Drax, Groot, Mantis, M'Baku, Okoye, Shuri, Peter Quill / Star-Lord, Dr. Stephen Strange, and Wong with the rest of the Wakandan army including Dora Milaje fight alongside the Avengers during the Infinity War and the Battle of Earth.
 Individuals like Howard the Duck, Korg, Kraglin Obfonteri, Miek, Pepper Potts, Valkyrie, Hope van Dyne / Wasp, the Masters of the Mystic Arts, the Ravagers, and the rest of the Asgardian army fight alongside the Avengers in the Battle of Earth, all earning their title as Avengers from Rogers.

Alternate versions

What If...?

The Avengers appear in the animated series What If...? (2021), which depicts the team in various alternate realities within the MCU Multiverse.

Death of the Avengers

In an alternate 2011, a vengeful Hank Pym eliminates the Avengers' candidates: Stark, Thor, Barton, Banner, and Romanoff. After Pym is defeated, Loki uses the opportunity to invade Earth. Meanwhile, Fury quietly prepares to reactivate the team after Rogers is discovered in the Arctic and Danvers responds to his call for help. Rogers, Danvers, and Fury later battle Loki and his Asgardian army aboard a Helicarrier. During the fight, the Watcher brings in a variant of Romanoff from a universe that was wiped out by Ultron, and she incapacitates Loki with his own scepter before being greeted by Fury.

Zombie outbreak

In an alternate 2018, a quantum virus is released turning people into zombies. Some of the Avengers respond to an outbreak in San Francisco and are subsequently infected as well. Banner and Parker survive, and with other allies, find Vision who is keeping an infected Wanda Maximoff alive by feeding her pieces of T'Challa. Vision sacrifices himself to provide them with the Mind Stone so that they can use it to find a cure, and Banner stays behind to keep Maximoff at bay, allowing Parker, T'Challa, and Lang to escape to Wakanda where unbeknownst to them, an infected Thanos awaits with most of the Infinity Stones.

Ultron's conquest
   
In an alternate 2015, Ultron successfully implants himself into Vision's body and exterminates the Avengers, except for Barton and Romanoff. Years later, when Ultron continues his campaign of destruction throughout the universe after obtaining the Infinity Stones, Barton and Romanoff fight Ultron's sentries. Realizing that their efforts are insignificant, they attempt to find a way to shutdown his AI, and eventually prepare to upload an analog copy of Arnim Zola consciousness into Ultron's hivemind, but Barton sacrifices himself in vain and the upload fails when Ultron enters the Multiverse.

Doctor Strange in the Multiverse of Madness

A version of the Avengers existed in Earth-838 with Peggy Carter / Captain Carter, being the first Avenger instead of Rogers.

Ant-Man and the Wasp: Quantumania

In several alternate universes, the Avengers were killed by Kang the Conqueror, who successfully conquered their universes.

Differences from the comics
While the name "Avengers" and the depiction of Loki as the first antagonist is derived more from the mainstream Marvel Universe, commonly referred to as "Earth-616", other different depictions such as the original formation of the Avengers at the hands of S.H.I.E.L.D. along with the depicted original lineup and the portrayal of the aliens known as Chitauri as main antagonists were portrayed with a similar premise as the Ultimates, a modern re-imagining of the Avengers within the comic book universe within the multiverse that is published by Marvel Comics. The original lineup of the Avengers included Hank Pym and the Wasp instead of Captain America, Black Widow and Hawkeye. The Ultimates introduced the same lineup of The Avengers with the Earth-616's version and the addition of Scarlet Witch and Quicksilver, both of whom later appeared in Avengers: Age of Ultron. The characters Rocket Raccoon and Nebula do not feature as Avengers members in the comics, differing from the film adaptations.

Reception

Critical response
The response of the introduction of the superhero team was the main highlight of The Avengers. A. O. Scott of The New York Times felt the chemistry of the characters were the best part of the film. Owen Gleiberman of Entertainment Weekly commented that the best thing regarding the film  "is that it also unleashes them on each other. Simply put: These freaks of goodness may be a team, but they don't like one another very much." Joe Morgenstein of the Wall Street Journal opined that the depiction of them quarreling among themselves comically was the most fun part as depicted in the original film. The team once again mostly received praise in the sequel with critics praising the original cast reprising the role in Avengers: Age of Ultron. Scott Foundas of Variety felt that the actors now "wear these roles as comfortably as second skins". He noted the Fantastic Four and Justice League as teams that can only hope to follow in the footsteps regarding the portrayal of the characters. Conversely, Scott Mendelson of Forbes disliked the concept that some of the Avengers (Tony Stark and Bruce Banner) were behind the creation of the antagonist of the film (Ultron).

The depiction of the Avengers being divided in a Civil War as shown in Captain America: Civil War was praised by critics such as Peter Bradshaw of The Guardian and Richard Roeper of the Chicago Sun-Times. However, Nicholas Barber of the BBC  was more critical of the depiction, opining that their allegiance didn't make sense. Additionally, Stephen Whitty of the New York Daily News was critical of the expansion of many heroes taking sides and felt the film was more of an "overstuffed" Avengers film than a Captain America film, as referred to in the title. In 2018, around the time Avengers: Infinity War  came out, film director James Cameron started a new term called "Avengers fatigue" that circulated online. Cameron told IndieWire that despite being a fan of the films, he feared that they had dominated the film genre, and that he hoped that people were getting tired of it so other stories could be told. This resulted in some criticism and backlash online regarding Cameron. The fourth Avengers film, Avengers: Endgame, was praised as a proper conclusion for the superhero team.

Themes and analysis
According to film critic Peter Travers, The Avengers director Joss Whedon "sees the Avengers as the ultimate dysfunctional family. Their powers have estranged them from the normal world. As a result, they're lonely, cranky, emotional fuck-ups, which the actors have a ball playing."
Also while reviewing the original Avengers films, Roger Ebert compared the original six lineup of the Avengers as uniquely different much like the assortment of dog breeds that consists of champions of the Westminster Kennel Club Dog Show. He noted that both examples "are completely different" but "yet they're all champions". Anthony Lane of The New Yorker explained that the superhero group was reminiscent to what "Bob Dylan, George Harrison, and the others did to form the Traveling Wilburys" in music pop-culture. Callie Ahlgrim of Insider Inc. described the Avengers as "the most ambitious superpowered team in cinematic history" when doing a rank down of most powerful Avengers within the MCU.

Cultural impact

The team was the inspiration behind the documentary series Marvel's Avengers: Building A Cinematic Universe in 2012. Another documentary series was created in 2014 titled Marvel Studios: Assembling a Universe. An online exhibition called Avengers S.T.A.T.I.O.N. based on the team is located currently in Las Vegas, Toronto and Seoul with a planned upcoming one in Huizhou. Avengers Campus, a series of attractions at various Disney Parks, is inspired by the MCU's Avengers, although it is an alternate version of the team. The first of these Campuses opened on June 4, 2021, at Disney California Adventure.

In other media

The book Wakanda Files: A Technological Exploration of the Avengers and Beyond focuses on the Avengers heroes in Shuri's perspective.

Marvel Comics published Dan Abnett's Avengers: Everybody Wants To Rule The World (2015) as a tie-in to Avengers: Age of Ultron. The lineup in the book includes Iron Man, Captain America, the Hulk, Thor, Black Widow, Hawkeye, Quicksilver, the Scarlet Witch, and the Vision.

In October 2019, Marvel Studios and ILMxLAB announced the virtual reality experience Avengers: Damage Control. The experience was available for a limited time starting in mid-October 2019 at select Void VR locations. The experience was extended to the end of 2019. ESPN and Marvel collaborated to create an alternate presentation that featured the Avengers among other Marvel superheroes entitled NBA Special Edition Presented by State Farm: Marvel's Arena of Heroes during the NBA playoff of the Golden State Warriors and the New Orleans Pelicans in May 2021.

See also
 Characters of the Marvel Cinematic Universe
 Teams and organizations of the Marvel Cinematic Universe

Notes

References

External links
 Avengers on the Marvel Cinematic Universe Wiki
 
 Avengers on Marvel.com

Avengers (film series)
Fictional organizations
Fictional vigilantes
Marvel Cinematic Universe characters
S.H.I.E.L.D. agents
Superhero teams